Tembagla, also known as Bo-Ung (Mbo-Ung), is one of the languages spoken in the Southern Highlands province of Papua New Guinea. Geographically the people are Kaugel, but their language appears to be closer to the related Medlpa.

Dialects are Ku Waru, Mara-Gomu, Miyemu (Miyem), and Tembalo (Tembaglo).

See also
Kailge Sign Language

References

External links

 The New Testament in the Mara-Gomu dialect of the Bo-Ung Language of Papua New Guinea

Languages of Western Highlands Province
Chimbu–Wahgi languages